Zum Zum was a New York City based restaurant chain that operated from the 1960s to the 1980s. The restaurants served German cuisine.

The rights were purchased in early 2022 by William Belida, owner of The Salon Group in NYC and is in the process of re-launching with an updated menu and brand focus.

History
Joe Baum, the president of Restaurant Associates, opened the first branch of Zum Zum in the Pan Am Building in concert with the opening of the 1964 World's Fair. The restaurants were unique in offering only counter seating. The menu included a variety of German wurst and freshly smoked meats. 

In Germany many restaurant signs begin with Zum which means To The. 

The Zum Zum logo featured a sausage in the shape of the letter "U". It was designed by George Lois and Kurt Weihs in 1963.

Criticism
New York Times restaurant critic Craig Claiborne wrote about the food: "The Zum Zum's sausages, whether bauernwurst or a frankfurter, are well seasoned and with good texture. The sausage salad, on the other hand, is an interesting idea but disappointing in preparation. Like the restaurant's potato salad, it seems vitally lacking in ingredients that would elevate its character, chopped onion, for example, chopped pickle and more herbs such as parsley. It is too bland for one palate."

When Zum Zum opened a restaurant in Harvard Square in Cambridge, Massachusetts, in 1969, The Harvard Crimson's restaurant critic Esther Dyson described its fare as follows: "Unless you like German food — about five different kinds of wursts — it's best to stick to the frankfurter with sauerkraut, a big juicy hotdog for 35 cents. The desserts, doughnuts, fruit salad, and apple crumbles, are also cheap and good. What Zum Zum does best is breakfast, the standard fare plus apple pancakes, although you have to eat it off pewter plates. A nice filling breakfast with assorted German jams and maple syrup will cost you just a dollar." Dyson also noted that the restaurant did not supply ketchup, "being strictly German," but instead had "china pots of mustard cutely labeled 'Das Sweet' and 'Das Hot'."

In popular culture
Zum Zum was mentioned in the 1974 Jobriath song "Scumbag," which in turn inspired a reference to "Zom Zom's" in the Gary Numan song "Down in the Park."

External links
 Zum Zum Website

References 

Restaurant chains in the United States
Restaurants established in 1964
1964 establishments in New York City